Monica Macaulay is a professor of linguistics at the University of Wisconsin–Madison, where she is also affiliated with the American Indian Studies Program.

Biography 
During her teenage years, Macaulay attended high school in Santiago, Chile.  It was here that she learned Spanish.  After graduating high school and traveling South America she then moved to Prescott, AZ.  She relocated shortly after to northern California and pursued art school before enrolling at UC Berkeley.

Macaulay received her PhD in 1987 for her research on morphology and cliticization in Chalcatongo Mixtec at the University of California, Berkeley.

She has worked on documenting various indigenous languages of North America, especially Menominee and Potawatomi. She has published a number of linguistic studies on, especially, the syntax and semantics of Mixtec, Karuk and Algonquian. She has also written a grammar of Chalcatongo Mixtec.

Honors 

In 2020, Macaulay was inducted as a Fellow of the Linguistic Society of America.

Macaulay is currently the president of the Endangered Language Fund, as well as the co-editor of the Papers of the Algonquian Conference.

Since 1996, she has been the project director for the Women in Linguistics Mentoring Alliance (WILMA), a project of the Linguistic Society of America. She has written a survival skills manual for graduate students in linguistics.

Key publications 
(2016) Macaulay, M., Salmons, J. Synchrony and diachrony in Menominee derivational morphology. (published in Morphology.)
(2015) Brugman, Claudia & Macaulay, Monica. Characterizing evidentiality (published in Linguistic Typology Volume 19 Issue 2)
(2014) Macaulay, M. Ézhe-bmadzimgek gdebodwéwadmi-zheshmomenan: Potawatomi Dictionary. (Co-compiled with Lindsay Marean, Laura Welcher, and Kimberly Wensaut; self-published with Forest County Potawatomi Community.)
(2012) Macaulay, M. Menominee Dictionary (Self-published with Menominee Tribe of Wisconsin.)
(2011) Macaulay, M. Surviving Linguistics: A Guide for Graduate Students (second edition). Somerville, MA: Cascadilla Press. (First edition 2006.)
(2009) Macaulay, M. A Beginner’s Dictionary of Menominee. (Co-compiled with Marianne Milligan; self-published with Menominee Tribe of Wisconsin.)
(1996) Macaulay, M. A Grammar of Chalcatongo Mixtec. (Grammar with texts and dictionary; 298 pp.) University of California Publications in Linguistics, Vol. 127. Berkeley, Los Angeles: University of California Press.

References

External links 
Academic homepage

Year of birth missing (living people)
Living people
Linguists from the United States
University of California, Berkeley alumni
University of Wisconsin–Madison faculty
Linguists of Algic languages
Women linguists
Fellows of the Linguistic Society of America